Thomas, Tom, or Tommy Jackson may refer to:

Academics
Thomas H. Jackson (born 1950), ninth president of the University of Rochester
Tom Jackson Jr. (born 1959), president of Black Hills State University, South Dakota
Thomas "Thom" Jackson (born 1960), American educational entrepreneur

Arts and entertainment
Thomas Jackson (architect) (1807–1890), Irish architect
Thomas R. Jackson (1826–1901), English-born American architect
Thomas Graham Jackson (1835–1924), architect
Thomas Jackson (author), author of the 1905 book The Lost Squire of Inglewood
Thomas Jackson (actor) (1886–1967), American actor in Manhattan Melodrama
Tommy Jackson (musician) (1926–1979), American country music fiddle player
Tom Jackson (actor) (born 1948), Canadian Métis actor and singer

Military
Stonewall Jackson (Thomas Jonathan Jackson, 1824–1863), Confederate general
Thomas Jonathan Jackson (sculpture), a 1921 bronze equestrian sculpture of Stonewall Jackson
Thomas Sturges Jackson (1842–1934), Royal Navy officer
Thomas Jackson (Royal Navy officer) (1868–1945), Royal Navy officer
Thomas Norman Jackson (1897–1918), English soldier, Victoria Cross recipient

Politics and government
Thomas Witter Jackson, Chief Justice of Jamaica, 1818–21
Thomas B. Jackson (1797–1881), U.S. Representative from New York
Thomas Hughes Jackson (1834–1930), mayor of Birkenhead
Thomas Wesley Jackson (1859–1934), Canadian politician
Thomas A. Jackson (1879–1955), socialist and Communist leader
Thomas A. Jackson (Wisconsin politician) (1829–1908), American politician in Wisconsin
Thomas Jackson (trade unionist) (a.k.a. Tom Jackson, 1925–2003), British labour rights organizer
Thomas Penfield Jackson (1937–2013), former U.S. District Court judge for the District of Columbia
Thomas Jackson (Alabama politician) (born 1949), member of the Alabama House of Representatives
Thomas Jackson (police chief), former Chief of Police of the Ferguson, Missouri Police Department

Religion
Thomas Jackson (theologian) (1579–1640), English theologian, and President of Corpus Christi College, Oxford
Thomas Jackson (minister) (1783–1873), English Wesleyan Methodist minister and writer
Thomas Jackson (Bishop-designate of Lyttelton) (1812–1886), of Lyttelton, New Zealand

Sports

American football
Tom Jackson (American football, born 1948), head football coach at the University of Connecticut (1983–1993)
Tom Jackson (American football, born 1951), ESPN analyst and former American football player
T. J. Jackson (defensive tackle) (born 1983), American football player from Alabama

Association football
Thomas Jackson (footballer, born 1876) (1876–1954), English footballer
Tom Jackson (footballer, born 1878) (1878–1916), footballer for St. Mirren and Scotland
Thomas Jackson (footballer, born 1896) (1896–?), English footballer who played for Burnley and Dundee
Tommy Jackson (footballer, born 1898) (1898–1975), footballer for Aston Villa
Tommy Jackson (footballer, born 1946), Northern Irish former footballer, played for Everton, Nottingham Forest and Manchester United

Other sports
Thomas Jackson (basketball) (born 1980), American basketball player
Tom Jackson (Australian footballer) (1881–1929), Australian footballer for Melbourne
Tommy Jackson (Australian footballer) (1885–1966), Australian footballer for St Kilda
Tom Jackson (rugby union) (1870–1952), Welsh rugby union international
Thomas Jackson (athlete) (1884–1967), American track and field athlete
Tommy Jackson (boxer) (1931–1982), heavyweight boxer

Others
Sir Thomas Jackson, 1st Baronet (1841–1915), first chief manager of Hong Kong and Shanghai Banking Corporation
Thomas Horatio Jackson (1879–1935), Nigerian newspaper editor and publisher
Thomas Jackson (physicist) (1773–1837), Scottish physicist
Thomas John Jackson (1792–1852), free African-American slave